Goldmedalist (stylized in all caps) is a private held South Korean entertainment company established in 2020 by Lee Sarang and Kim Mi-hye. It currently manages actors Kim Soo-hyun, Seo Yea-ji, and Seol In-ah. It has also co-produced the 2020 romantic television series It's Okay to Not Be Okay and 2021 One Ordinary Day.

Establishment
In December 2019, media reported that Kim Soo-hyun will set up his own agency with his cousin Lee Sarang leaving his then management company KeyEast. On January 1, 2020, Goldmedalist was established by the director Lee Sarang and the producer Kim Mi-hye, who have worked with Kim Soo-hyun since the 2009 Korean drama Will It Snow for Christmas?. Along with Kim Soo-hyun, the company recruited actresses Seo Yea-ji and Kim Sae-ron. 

As of December 2020, ex-KeyEast executive Shin Phil is the Chief executive officer (CEO) of the company and manages a total of eleven artists.

Artists
List of actors:
 
 Kim Soo-hyun (2020–present)
 Seo Yea-ji (2020–present)
 Seol In-ah (2022–present)
 Choi Hyun-wook (2020–present)
 Kim Su-gyeom (2020–present)
 Kim Seung-ho (2020–present)
 Jo Seung-hee (2020–present)
 Lee Chae-min (2020–present)
 Lee Jong-hyun (2020–present)
 Yoo Eun-ji (2021–present)
 Jeong Han-seol (2022–present)

List of former actors:

 Kim Sae-ron (2020–2022)

Works

Television series

Notes

References

External links
  
  

Talent agencies of South Korea
Entertainment companies established in 2020
Television production companies of South Korea
2020 establishments in South Korea